Pseudoclanis tomensis is a species of hawkmoth of the family Sphingidae. It occurs on the island of São Tomé. It was first described by Jacques Pierre in 1992.

The wingspan is about 65 mm for males. The forewing upperside is very similar to Pseudoclanis postica but with a broad, dark marginal band. The hindwing upperside is bright yellow with a very straight median line.

References

Pseudoclanis
Moths described in 1992
Endemic fauna of São Tomé Island
Endemic moths of São Tomé and Príncipe